Middle East Airlines – Air Liban, more commonly known as Middle East Airlines – MEA, is the national airline of Lebanon, with its head office in Beirut. and its base at Beirut Rafic Hariri International Airport. It operates international flights to 34 destinations (31-year-round and 3 seasonal destinations) in 22 countries in Africa, the Middle East, and Europe, as of summer 2016.

Middle East Airlines was founded on 31 May 1945 by Saeb Salam, with operational and technical support from BOAC. Operations started on 1 January 1946 using three de Havilland DH.89A Dragon Rapides on flights between Beirut and Nicosia, followed by flights to Iraq, Egypt, and Syria.

Destinations

Note - MEA also served Haifa and Lydda in former British Mandate Palestine till 1948.

References

Middle East Airlines
Lists of airline destinations